African Organization for Standardization is an Intergovernmental organization of 42 countries of Africa. It also led the continental program Eco Mark Africa.

History 
It was formed by United Nations Economic Commission for Africa and Organisation of African Unity in August 17, 1977 at Accra, Ghana with 21 African governments.

Purpose 
The purpose of the organization is to facilitate trade between Countries of Africa with the Countries of the world and to maintain a framework for production of cocoa beans.

Member Countries 
The 42 members of African Organization for Standardization are Algeria, Botswana, Benin, Burkina Faso, Cameroon, Cote d’Ivoire, Congo Brazzaville, Chad, Democratic Republic of Congo, Djibouti, Egypt, Ethiopia, Eswatini, Gabon, Ghana, Guinea, Guinea Bissau, Kenya, Liberia, Madagascar, Malawi, Mauritius, Morocco, Namibia, New State of Libya, Niger, Nigeria, Rwanda, Sierra Leone, Somalia, Senegal, Seychelles, Sierra Leone, Sudan, South Sudan, South Africa, Tanzania, Togo, Tunisia, Uganda, Zambia, Zimbabwe and Zanzibar.

References 

Intergovernmental organizations
Organizations established in 1977
International economic organizations
Organizations established by the United Nations